Syzygium palghatense is a species of plant in the family Myrtaceae. It is endemic to India.  It is threatened by habitat loss. It has been discovered in large numbers in Bhrahmagiri hills near Karnataka in 2014

References

palghatense
Flora of Kerala
Critically endangered plants
Taxonomy articles created by Polbot